Nicholas Parker may refer to:

Nick Parker (journalist), English journalist
Nicholas Parker (MP) (1547–1620), MP for Sussex
Nick Parker (born 1954), British Army officer